The Brown Acid Caveat is the seventh full-length album by the experimental rock group The Tear Garden released on July 7, 2017 after starting a successful PledgeMusic campaign in August 2016. The campaign, which achieved 117% of its financial goal, allowed for the inclusion of a number of guest musicians including Dre Robinson and former Legendary Pink Dots members Ryan Moore, Martijn De Kleer, and Patrick Q. Wright. The album title refers to an announcement given to spectators of the first Woodstock Festival in 1969 to avoid "brown acid" -- a type of LSD reportedly associated with bad trips.

Track listing
"Strange Land" – 5:44
"Stars on the Sidewalk" – 7:32
"Amy's Personality" – 6:29
"Calling Time" – 4:28
"On with the Show" – 7:23
"Sinister Science" – 7:26
"Lola's Rock" – 5:58
"Kiss Don't Tell" – 7:42
"A Private Parade" – 7:09
"The Sound of Space Escaping" – 5:26
"Seven Veils" – 7:10
"Object" – 4:19

Personnel
Credits adapted from liner notes of The Brown Acid Caveat.

The Tear Garden
cEvin Key - bass, devices, drums, keyboards, percussion
Edward Ka-Spel - keyboards, vocals

Additional musicians
Ryan Moore - bass
Martijn De Kleer - guitar
Patrick Q. Wright - viola, violin 
Dre Robinson - percussion
Alice - voices

Technical personnel
Greg Reely - mastering, mixing
Peter Clarke - artwork
Simon Paul - assembly

References

The Tear Garden albums
Nettwerk Records albums